Orari Bridge is a small settlement north of Geraldine, New Zealand on the south side of the Orari River. The Orari Bridge is located several kilometers upstream of the township of Orari on State Highway 79. Where the road crosses the river there is a one-laned bridge which is often subject to congestion. The Geraldine Community Board has appealed for the bridge to be converted from a one lane bridge to a  two lane to minimize congestion and improve safety. The New Zealand Transport Agency has yet to commit funds to enable this to happen. In December 2019, calls continue for the bridge to be converged to a two lane bridge urgently. Two people sustained moderate injuries in a crash on the bridge in July 2020. The National Party in September 2020 said that they would commit to converted the Orari Bridge to a two lane structure.

A nearby popular mountain bike track meets the bridge at Orari Bridge.

Buildings

Orari Bridge School 
The Orari Bridge School was opened in 1881 using half of the remaining building from the nearby closed Waihi Bush School. The school was burned down in 1905 but rebuilt. The school closed permanently in 1996. It is now home to a holiday park.

Orari Bridge Hall 
The light green Orari Bridge Hall was a notable landmark for motorists driving on State Highway 79. The hall was constructed in 1922 to serve the various needs of the community. The hall was put up for sale in 2009 and a recently constructed private residence is now situated on the halls previous location.

Reference List 

Timaru District
Populated places in Canterbury, New Zealand